The 2003–04 season was Fussball Club Basel 1893's 111th in existence and the club's 10th consecutive season in the Nationalliga A, the top flight of Swiss football. Basel played their home games in the newly constructed St. Jakob-Park complex. Local businessman Werner Edelmann was the club's chairman for the second consecutive season.

The Club's main aims for the 2003–04 season were to regain the league title and, as cup holders, to retain their cup title. The third aim was to remain in the UEFA Cup as long as possible. During pre-season Basel won the Uhrencup and the Alpen Cup. After being the surprise package in Europe in the 2002–03 season, Basel could not bring this form into the UEFA Cup in 2003–04 as they were eliminated by Newcastle United in the second round after defeating Malatyaspor in the previous round.

The Super League season started impeccably, Basel won the first thirteen matches straight off. They completed the first half of the season undefeated, with seventeen wins and one draw. Basel remained in top position right up until the end of the season, thus achieving their championship aim. In the club's history this was their tenth championship title.

Overview

Off-season and pre-season
Christian Gross was the first team trainer for the fifth successive season. Former Basel youth player David Degen, who had started his professional career with FC Aarau in 2000 returned to the club. Basel's biggest signing in advance of the 2003–04 season was Matías Emilio Delgado from Chacarita Juniors 

But in the other direction Bernt Haas returned to West Bromwich Albion after the end of the loan period. Ljubo Miličević returned to Zürich as his loan contract had also ended and Carlos Varela was loaned out to FC Aarau. Further Hakan Yakin left the club and transferred to Paris Saint-Germain. Following the players arrival at the club, PSG manager Vahid Halilhodžić diagnosed him as not fit enough to train with the team and so sent Yakin into individual training. After five/six week of individual training, Halilhodžić hadn't changed his opinion and the contract between club and player was dissolved under mutual consent and Yakin returned to Basel. During the last few matches of the calendar year, he played a few matches for FCB.

FC Basel started the season off with various warm-up matches. These included teams from the Swiss lower league as well as teams from the German Bundesliga, the French Ligue 1 and the Romanian Liga I. The season began on 16 July 2003 with the home game against Zürich.

Despite the fact that Grasshopper Club Zürich were the reigning Swiss champions, Basel were favourites to win the domestic championship title. As runners-up of the previous Nationalliga A season, Basel entered the UEFA Cup in first round. The club’s aims for the new season were clear, the league title must be won, the cup title was to be defended and that the team should remain in the 2003–04 UEFA Cup competition, at least two rounds or even better until the winter break.

Winter break
During the winter break Marco Streller and Hakan Yakin both transferred out to VfB Stuttgart. Basel signed Francisco Gabriel Guerrero for six months on loan from FC Zürich.

The Campaign

Domestic League
The Swiss Football Association (ASF-SFV) had changed the format of the domestic league. Since the 1987–88 Nationalliga A season there were 24 teams in the Nationalliga, 12 in the Nationalliga A and 12 in the Nationalliga B. In the first stage there was a qualifying phase played as double round-robin. In the second phase the top eight clubs played a further double round-robin for the championship. Last season was last in that format. The new format was called Swiss Super League, or with the sponsor’s name Axpo Super League. As of this season, there were ten teams in the top tier and seventeen in the second tier. In the top tier, the teams played a double round-robin in the first half of the season and then another double round-robin in the second half. There were three points for a victory and one each for a draw. The champions and runners-up would enter the qualifying rounds of the 2004–05 Champions League, the third placed team would enter the UEFA Cup second qualifying round. The bottom placed team would be relegated the second last team would play a play-off against relegation.

Basel's priority aim for the season was to win the league championship.

First half of season
The season began on 16 July 2003 with the home game against Zürich in the St. Jakob-Park with 30,561 spectators. Hakan Yakin netted the first goal for FCB on 33 minutes. After the break, against the run of play, on 51 minutes Alhassane Keita scored the equaliser. Basel pressed for the winner and on 86 minutes following a set piece Benjamin Huggel realised it and FCB won 2–1. The second league match was away against Young Boys in sold out Stadion Neufeld in Bern with an attendance of 11,850 fans. Basel went ahead through a goal from  Christian Giménez in the 20th minute. YB equalised 7 minutes later, Leandro was the goal scorer. Immediately after the break, on 47 minutes, Joël Magnin put the hosts in front. FCB switched up a gear and forced YB back straight away and one minute late they were rewarded with their equaliser through Marco Streller. Basel dominated and on 75 minutes  Antonio Esposito scored the winning 3–2 goal for the visitors. During the match on 16 August in the Stadion Lachen Christian Giménez scored a hattrick as FCB won 4–0 against Thun. In fact, the season started impeccably, Basel won the first thirteen matches straight off, before they lost their first points in the away game against Aarau in the Stadion Brügglifeld with a 2–2 draw. Basel moved to the top of the league table from the first round and held this position without problem. 

Despite disappointing results in the Cup and the UEFA Cup in November, the team held motivation high. They completed the first half of the league season undefeated, with seventeen victories and one draw.

Second half of season
Despite an away win in round 19 against Young Boys to the start of the second half of the season, the team was not as steadfast as it had been before the winter break. In round 20 they misplayed a two-goal advantage at home against Grasshopper Club and had to be satisfied with a 2–2 draw. This was followed by a victory against Xamax and then a further two draws. On matchday 24 they were defeated for the first time in the domestic league losing 1–0 in the Letzigrund against Zürich. The team regrouped and Basel remained in top position in the table until the end of the season, thus won the championship.

Conclusion
The team achieved their championship aim. This was the club's tenth championship title in its history. They won the championship with 26 victories and seven draws, the team had suffered just three away defeats, and obtained 85 points. This meant that they were 13 points ahead of second placed Young Boys. Wil were bottom-placed and relegated and Neuchâtel Xamax played the play-out.

The team completed the seasons eighteen home ties undefeated, winning fourteen and drawing four. Their biggest home wins were two 6-0 wins against Servette in the first half of the season and Neuchâtel Xamax after the winter break. Four home games were reported as sold out, the highest attendance being 30,800 spectators on 23 November 2003 in their highest scoring match of the season, a 5–2 win against Grasshopper.

Basel scored 86 goals during their league season, conceding 32. Christian Giménez was the team’s top league scorer with 16 goals, Marco Streller second best with 13 and both Benjamin Huggel and Julio Hernán Rossi netted eight times. Scott Chipperfield, Hervé Tum and Murat Yakin each scored seven times.

Domestic Cup
As cup holders the club's clear aim was to defend the trophy, or in minimum to reach the final, because this would again be played in their home stadium St. Jakob-Park. The format of the cup had also been changed and all league teams now started in the first round. Here they were seeded and could not play against each other. In a match, the home advantage was granted to the team from the lower league, if applicable. 

Alle (19 September 2003)
Basel were drawn against lower league team FC Alle, who at that time played in the fourth tier of Swiss football. FCB head coach rotated the team, with captain Murat Yakin and Marco Streller he let two regular starters have a day off and the duo Matías Delgado and David Degen took their place on the bench. In front of over 4,000 spectators Basel started with strength and much tempo into the game. Marco Zwyssig, in the 8th minute, Benjamin Huggel, in the 18th and Julio Hernán Rossi in the 20th put the favourites three goals up and with this advantage they reduced their pressure. The hosts were overwhelmed, but were willing to fight for their dignity and honour and on 37 minutes scored their consolation goal. Basel reacted and within 60 seconds restored the three-goal advantage as Rossi scored his brace. Ten minutes after the break Huggel also achieved a brace with a long-distance shot. Basel controlled the rest of the match and went home with a 5–1 victory.

Urania (19 October 2003)
In the next round FCB were drawn against Urania Genève Sport, who at that time also played in the fourth tier. The run of play in this second-round game was similar to the first-round match. Basel used their tempo to put the lower-class team under pressure. The outcome was very similar, again Marco Zwyssig, this time in the 7th minute, again Julio Hernán Rossi, this time in the 15th minute and Antonio Esposito on 19 minutes put the visitors three goals up. Basel were then content to hold the ball in their possession and to keep play away from their area. Alexandre Quennoz added Basel’s fourth just before the interval. In the second period FCB retained the hosts under control and did not allow the amateur team to create dangerous moves. This was successful until the 80th minute, as only a foul in the area could stop the visitor’s efforts. Pascal Zuberbühler was equal to the spot-kick and held. However, in the last minute of the game he was beaten and the hosts scored their consolation goal.

Grasshopper Club (9 November 2003)
In the third round Basel were drawn away against the Grasshoppers. The match in the Hardturm was played in front of 13,100 fans. GC played well and took advantage of the fact that FCB had had a difficult game three days before against Newcastle United. GC controlled most of the first period keeping the visitors at bay and FCB could only create two dangerous chances. In the second period GC pressed forward believing in their chance and on 63 minutes Eduardo put them into the lead. Basel reacted and pushed forward in their turn creating good opportunities, but the hosts defence held fast and salvaged the 1–0 lead over the final whistle.

Conclusion
Basel were eliminated early in the competition and missed their domestic cup aim. Grasshoppers advanced as far as the final, but here they were surprisingly defeated by Wil.

Europe
As runners-up in the Swiss championship the previous season and as Swiss Cup winners Basel were qualified for the UEFA Cup first round. The club's aim was remain in the UEFA Cup as long as possible. But after being the surprise package in Europe in the 2002–03 season, Basel could not bring this form into the UEFA Cup in 2003–04.

Malatyaspor (24 September 2003)
In the first round Basel were drawn against Malatyaspor and played the first leg away in the Malatya İnönü Stadium in Malatya in front of a sold out 10,000 capacity attendance. Basel had to play without their best scorer Christian Giménez, defender Timothée Atouba, and the midfield players Esposito and Ivan Ergic who were out injured. Basel started well into the game and their captain Murat Yakin put them a goal up after 15 minutes. The home team increased the pressure after the break and the visitors defence had to play at their best. Despite seeing the yellow card in the 51st minute, the visitors captain and centre back was the best Basel player on the day. Basel goalkeeper Pascal Zuberbühler also saw the yellow card in after 71 minutes for time-wasting, but he was able to keep a clean score sheet until the end of the game. The captains younger brother Hakan, who had been substituted in just seven minutes earlier, finished off Basel's good move in the 75th minute to give the visitors a two goal lead. And the 2–0 lead was held up until the end of the game.

Return match (15 October 2003)
Basel started very quickly into the second leg match held at St. Jakob-Park with two good early chances. Hervé Tum's header after just 45 seconds was a little too wide and Timothée Atouba tried a long range shot only a minute later but this was somewhat too high. But then the home team then defended their aggregate lead by simply keeping their Turkish opponents at bay by giving them a lot of space in the midfield area. Basel's goalkeeper Pascal Zuberbühler only had to get involved once during the first half, this after 35 minutes as Muhammet Akagündüz appeared threateningly before him, but Atouba got back quickly to clear the danger. After the break the game changed. The visitors pushed forward with more pressure, Fazli Ulusoy had their first chance, but his shot hit the outside of the post. Then Celaleddin Koçak reacted quickest on a loose ball and to beat Zuberbühler after 64 minutes. Muhammet Akagündüz also saw his shot bounce back of the post after 71 minutes. Malatyaspor kept up their pressure and six minutes from time, Kocak managed to net his second goal as he reacted quicker than the Basel defence to beat Zuberbühler with a well-placed header. The game ended with an aggregate 2–2 draw and thus went into over time. The momentum of the second half seemed to be with the visitors, however, Basel were able to regroup themselves and Marco Streller's silver goal saw them through to the second round.

Newcastle United (6 November 2003)
In the second round Basel were drawn against Newcastle United. The first leg was held at St. Jakob-Park with a sell-out 30,000 capacity. Basel started quickly with much momentum at the beginning of the first half. They had already come close on a couple of occasions before Mario Cantaluppi slammed home a powerful drive from outside the penalty area in the 11th minute. The visitors reacted very quickly, Laurent Robert was sent clear of the defence two minutes later. The French winger finished with composure and he sent his low shot into the far corner of the goal. Another two minutes later Basel were awarded a corner kick. Defender Andy O'Brien headed the ball clear but the danger was not over. Scott Chipperfield was able to collect the free ball and his shot was slightly deflected as it beat Newcastle keeper Shay Given. Newcastle always seemed to be in danger as Basel pushed forward. Especially Christian Giménez was always dangerous and the tall Marco Streller was always a danger as high balls were sent into the centre. The English side deserve credit for standing out that spell without any further damage. Then the found their second equaliser. In the 37th minute Gary Speed first tried to send his header home after a Laurent Robert corner, but the ball was blocked, Titus Bramble reacted quickly on the loose ball and forced it over the line. Before the break Christian Giménez headed the ball against a post and in the second-half, substitute Julio Hernán Rossi forced Nolberto Solano to clear off the line when a corner came unexpectedly to him and diverted the ball with his face. Towards the end of the match Newcastle were the more dominant side and it was a pass from Solano that set up the winning goal. Shola Ameobi skilfully shook off Marco Zwyssig before driving the ball between the legs of keeper Pascal Zuberbühler. Basel's head coach Christian Gross blamed defensive errors for the 2–3 home defeat.

Return match (27 November 2003)
The second leg was played at St James' Park in front of 40,325 spectators and was arbitrated by Danish referee Knud Erik Fisker. He was the first-person taking action that evening by showing Newcastle’s captain Alan Shearer a yellow card after just 15 seconds. In that action Basel defender Marco Zwyssig was injured and he left the game in the fourth minute, being substituted by Boris Smiljanić. Smiljanić himself was involved in the next action. A Laurent Robert corner was completely misjudged by Basel goalkeeper Pascal Zuberbühler and the ball bounced off the unlucky substitute’s shin. Chipperfield cleared the ball, but it had already crossed the line and referee Fisker signalled the goal without hesitation. The rest of the game remained unspectacular, Newcastle controlled the game, but Basel remained dangerous on the counter. However, no further goals followed.

Basel were eliminated by Newcastle United in the second round 2–4 on aggregate.

Conclusion
The club had hoped that they could have continued a round or perhaps two further, but despite being knocked out at this stage, they considered that that had achieved their European aim for this season.

Club

The Management

Kit

|
|

Other information

Players

First team squad

Transfers Summer 2003

In

Out

Transfers Winter 2003-04

In

Out

Results and fixtures

Friendlies

Pre- and mid-season friendlies

Uhrencup
The Uhrencup is a club football tournament, held annually in Grenchen.

Alpen Cup

Winter break and mid-season friendlies

2003–04 Swiss Super League

First half of season
The Swiss Super League season was contested by ten teams.

Second half of season

Final league table

Swiss Cup

UEFA Cup

First round

Aggregate: 3-2 / Basel win on silver goal

Second round

Aggregate: Newcastle win 4-2 on aggregate

References

Sources
 Rotblau: Jahrbuch Saison 2015/2016. Publisher: FC Basel Marketing AG. 
 Rotblau: Jahrbuch Saison 2017/2018. Publisher: FC Basel Marketing AG. 
 Die ersten 125 Jahre / 2018. Publisher: Josef Zindel im Friedrich Reinhardt Verlag, Basel. 
 Season 2003–04 at "Basler Fussballarchiv” homepage
 Switzerland 2003–04 at RSSSF

External links
 FC Basel official site

FC Basel seasons
Basel
2003-04